Yuri Yevgenyevich Kolchin (born 22 December 1976 in Krasnodar) is a former Russian football player.

References

External links
 

1976 births
Sportspeople from Krasnodar
Living people
Russian footballers
FC Lada-Tolyatti players
Russian Premier League players
FC Volga Nizhny Novgorod players
Association football midfielders
Association football forwards